Faith is a CD Released by Dynamic Praise in 2001.

Track listing

Dynamic Praise albums
2001 live albums